Harold Craddock Stead was an Anglican priest in  the twentieth century.

He was educated at Salisbury Theological College; and ordained in 1957. After a curacy in Eastleigh he was the  Rector of Layou and Buccament from 1962 to 1966 when he became Archdeacon of St Vincent.

References

Alumni of Salisbury Theological College
Archdeacons of St Vincent